Abu'l-Qasim Jafar, was an Iranian statesman from the Fasanjas family who served the Buyid dynasty.

He was the son of Abu'l-Faraj Muhammad, and was appointed in 1012 by the Buyid ruler Sultan al-Dawla as his vizier. Abu'l Qasim Jafar later died in 1029. He has a son known as Dhu'l-Sa'adat, who continued to occupy high offices under the Buyids.

Sources 
 
 
 

Fasanjas family
1029 deaths
11th-century Iranian people
People from Shiraz
Year of birth unknown
Buyid viziers